is a railway station in Tsuwano, Kanoashi District, Shimane Prefecture, Japan.

Lines 
 West Japan Railway Company (JR West)
 Yamaguchi Line

Adjacent stations

External links 
 

Railway stations in Shimane Prefecture
Railway stations in Japan opened in 1924